Pasireotide, sold under the brand name Signifor, is an orphan drug approved in the United States and the European Union for the treatment of Cushing's disease in patients who fail or are ineligible for surgical therapy. It was developed by Novartis. Pasireotide is a somatostatin analog with a 40-fold increased affinity to somatostatin receptor 5 compared to other somatostatin analogs.

The most common side effects include hyperglycaemia (high blood sugar levels), diabetes, diarrhoea, abdominal pain (stomach ache), nausea (feeling sick), cholelithiasis (gallstones), injection site reactions, and tiredness.

Pasireotide was approved for Cushing's disease by the European Medicines Agency (EMA) in April 2012  and by the U.S. Food and Drug Administration (FDA) in December 2012.

Pasireotide LAR (the long-acting-release formulation) was approved by the FDA for treatment of acromegaly in December 2014, and had been approved for this indication by the EMA in September 2014.

References

External links 
 

Orphan drugs
Peptides
Somatostatin receptor agonists
Novartis brands